Eden Agero (born 17 September 1990) is a Kenyan rugby sevens player. He competed in the men's tournament at the 2020 Summer Olympics.

References

External links
 

1990 births
Living people
Male rugby sevens players
Olympic rugby sevens players of Kenya
Rugby sevens players at the 2020 Summer Olympics
Place of birth missing (living people)
Simba XV players